400ER may refer to:
Boeing 747-400ER, aircraft variant
Boeing 767-400ER, aircraft variant